A result (also called upshot) is the final consequence of a sequence of actions or events expressed qualitatively or quantitatively.  Possible results include advantage, disadvantage, gain, injury, loss, value and victory. There may be a range of possible outcomes associated with an event depending on the point of view, historical distance or relevance. Reaching no result can mean that actions are inefficient, ineffective, meaningless or flawed.

Some types of result are as follows:
 in general, the outcome of any kind of research, action or phenomenon
 in games (e.g. cricket, lotteries) or wars, the result includes the identity of the victorious party and possibly the effects on the environment
 in mathematics, the final value of a calculation (e.g. arithmetic operation), function or statistical expression, or the final statement of a theorem that has been proven
 in statistics, any information analyzed, extracted or interpolated from polls, tests or logs
 in computer sciences, the return value of a function, state of a system or list of records matching a query (e.g. web search). The result type is the data type of the data returned by a function.
 in science, the outcome of an experiment (e.g. see null hypothesis)
 in forensics and justice, the proof of guilt or innocence of a suspect after evaluating evidence in a criminal investigation
 in economics and accounting, the profit or loss at the end of a fiscal period.
 in democracy, the election of a representative or the outcome of a vote on a subject
 In management and related fields, a result is a piece of information that has certain properties in absolute terms or in relation to previous results or settings
 In a chemistry mix, the result is the final item

See also

 Determinism
 IMRAD

Logical consequence